Elections to Craigavon Borough Council were held on 5 May 2005 on the same day as the other Northern Irish local government elections. The election used four district electoral areas to elect a total of 26 councillors.

Election results

Note: "Votes" are the first preference votes.

Districts summary

|- class="unsortable" align="centre"
!rowspan=2 align="left"|Ward
! % 
!Cllrs
! % 
!Cllrs
! %
!Cllrs
! %
!Cllrs
! % 
!Cllrs
! %
!Cllrs
!rowspan=2|TotalCllrs
|- class="unsortable" align="center"
!colspan=2 bgcolor="" | DUP
!colspan=2 bgcolor="" | UUP
!colspan=2 bgcolor="" | Sinn Féin
!colspan=2 bgcolor="" | SDLP
!colspan=2 bgcolor="" | Alliance
!colspan=2 bgcolor="white"| Others
|-
|align="left"|Craigavon Central
|bgcolor="#D46A4C"|33.4
|bgcolor="#D46A4C"|3
|26.7
|2
|20.4
|1
|13.2
|1
|6.4
|0
|0.0
|0
|7
|-
|align="left"|Loughside
|4.0
|0
|4.1
|0
|bgcolor="#008800"|50.5
|bgcolor="#008800"|3
|39.3
|2
|0.0
|0
|2.1
|0
|5
|-
|align="left"|Lurgan
|39.4
|3
|bgcolor="40BFF5"|40.2
|bgcolor="40BFF5"|3
|7.5
|0
|6.5
|0
|0.0
|0
|6.4
|0
|7
|-
|align="left"|Portadown
|bgcolor="#D46A4C"|42.5
|bgcolor="#D46A4C"|3
|14.5
|1
|16.5
|1
|13.2
|1
|2.7
|0
|10.6
|1
|7
|- class="unsortable" class="sortbottom" style="background:#C9C9C9"
|align="left"| Total
|30.8
|9
|22.8
|6
|22.4
|6
|16.9
|4
|2.4
|0
|4.7
|0
|26
|-
|}

District results

Craigavon Central

2001: 2 x DUP, 2 x UUP, 2 x SDLP, 1 x Sinn Féin
2005: 3 x DUP, 2 x UUP, 1 x Sinn Féin, 1 x SDLP
2001–2005 Change: DUP gain from SDLP

Loughside

2001: 3 x SDLP, 2 x Sinn Féin
2005: 3 x Sinn Féin, 2 x SDLP
2001–2005 Change: Sinn Féin gain from SDLP

Lurgan

2001: 4 x UUP, 2 x DUP, 1 x SDLP
2005: 3 x UUP, 3 x DUP, 1 x Sinn Féin
2001–2005 Change: DUP and Sinn Féin gain from UUP and SDLP

Portadown

2001: 2 x DUP, 2 x UUP, 1 x Sinn Féin, 1 x SDLP, 1 x Independent
2005: 3 x DUP, 1 x Sinn Féin, 1 x UUP, 1 x SDLP, 1 x Independent
2001–2005 Change: DUP gain from UUP

References

Craigavon Borough Council elections
Craigavon